Gossypium darwinii, or Darwin's cotton, is a species of cotton plant which is found only on the Galapagos Islands.  Genetic studies indicate that it is most closely related to the native American species Gossypium barbadense, thus it is surmised that a seed arrived from South America on the wind, in the droppings of a bird or associated with debris by sea.

References

 Genetic Study of Darwin's cotton

External links
 UC Botanical Garden Photo of Darwin's cotton

darwinii
Endemic flora of Galápagos